Malango is a Southeast Solomonic language of Guadalcanal.

External links 
 Materials on Malango are included in the open access Arthur Capell collections (AC1 and AC2) held by Paradisec.

References

Gela-Guadalcanal languages
Languages of the Solomon Islands